Alku may refer to:
 3037 Alku, an asteroid
 Alku, Iran, a village
 Alku and Alku Toinen, an apartment building